D12 is an American hip-hop group originating from Detroit, Michigan.

D12 may also refer to:

In military transport:
 ARA Heroína (D-12), a 1983 Argentine Navy MEKO 360H2 series destroyer
 Albatros D.XII, a 1918 German single-seat fighter biplane
 Pfalz D.XII, a 1918 German fighter aircraft
 HMS Striker (D12), a 1942 British converted aircraft carrier
 D-12 Almirante Clemente, a Venezuelan Navy Almirante Clemente class destroyer
 D-12 armoured car, a Soviet military vehicle of the early 1930s
 Dewoitine D.12, a French fighter aircraft

In civilian transport:
 Spyker D12, a luxury vehicle made by Dutch car company Spyker
 Bavarian D XII, an 1897 German steam locomotive model
 Curtiss D-12, a 1923 aircraft engine
 GS&WR Class D12, a Great Southern and Western Railway Irish steam locomotive

In other uses:
 a nickname for DirecTV-12, a DirecTV satellite
 D12, part of the Allis-Chalmers D Series of tractors
 a nickname for NBA All-Star Dwight Howard, whose jersey number is 12
 d12, a twelve-sided polyhedral die used in many games
 Dublin 12, a Dublin, Ireland postal district
 Familial adenomatous polyposis ICD-10 code
 Acronym for Double 12, mean two tanks with 12 liter in Scuba diving
 D12, the eldest eaglet from the 2012 clutch of the Decorah Bald Eagles
 D12 road (Croatia), a state road in central Croatia